This is a list of episodes from the third season of The Many Loves of Dobie Gillis; the series' on-screen title was shortened to Dobie Gillis during this season.

This season begins with the enrollment of Dobie Gllis, Maynard G. Krebs, and Zelda Gilroy at Central City's S. Peter Pryor Junior College, after Dobie's and Maynard's discharges from the U.S. Army. The rest of the episodes of the season feature the trio adjusting to college life, and Dobie continuing to deal with life with his parents, Herbert and Winifred Gillis, and working in (or trying not to work in) his father's grocery store.

Broadcast history
The season originally aired Tuesdays at 8:30-9:00 pm (EST) on CBS from October 10, 1961 to June 26, 1962.

Nielsen ratings
The season ranked twenty-first with a 22.9 rating.

DVD release
The Region 1 DVD of the entire series was released on July 2, 2013.

Cast

Main
 Dwayne Hickman as Dobie Gillis
 Frank Faylen as Herbert T. Gillis (29 episodes)
 Florida Friebus as Winifred "Winnie" Gillis (21 episodes)
 Bob Denver as Maynard G. Krebs

Recurring
 Sheila James as Zelda Gilroy (10 episodes)
 Steve Franken as Chatsworth Osborne, Jr. (7 episodes)
 William Schallert as Professor Leander Pomfritt (10 episodes)
 Doris Packer as Mrs. Chatsworth Osbourne, Sr. (4 episodes)
 Jean Byron as Dr. Imogene Burkhart (4 episodes)
 Tuesday Weld as Thalia Menninger (1 special guest appearance)

Episodes

References

External links
 

1961 American television seasons
1962 American television seasons
3